Ernest 'Ernie' Lumsden (27 June 1890 – 8 August 1982) was an Australian rules footballer who played for Collingwood and Essendon in the Victorian Football League (VFL).

Football
He was also known by his nickname 'Snowy' and was a cousin of teammate Dick Lee.

A utility player, Lumsden started his Collingwood career in 1910 but struggled to hold his place in the side with just 15 games in three seasons. As a result, he crossed to Essendon in 1913 where he played mainly as a forward, topping their goalkicking in 1914 with 28 goals. He had more success in his second stint at Collingwood, getting regular games and playing in the club's 1917 and 1919 premierships, in a forward pocket.

References

References
Holmesby, Russell and Main, Jim (2007). The Encyclopedia of AFL Footballers. 7th ed. Melbourne: Bas Publishing.

External links

1890 births
1982 deaths
Australian rules footballers from Melbourne
Australian Rules footballers: place kick exponents
Collingwood Football Club players
Collingwood Football Club Premiership players
Essendon Football Club players
Northcote Football Club players
Two-time VFL/AFL Premiership players
People from Collingwood, Victoria